Novafroneta is a genus of South Pacific dwarf spiders that was first described by A. D. Blest in 1979.

Species
 it contains six species, found in New Zealand:
Novafroneta annulipes Blest, 1979 – New Zealand
Novafroneta gladiatrix Blest, 1979 – New Zealand
Novafroneta nova Blest & Vink, 2003 – New Zealand
Novafroneta parmulata Blest, 1979 – New Zealand
Novafroneta truncata Blest & Vink, 2003 – New Zealand
Novafroneta vulgaris Blest, 1979 (type) – New Zealand

See also
 List of Linyphiidae species (I–P)

References

Araneomorphae genera
Linyphiidae
Spiders of New Zealand